The al-Bana rocket launcher is a weapon developed by Hamas's Izz ad-Din al-Qassam Brigades under the direction of Adnan al-Ghoul and Mohammed Deif. Made from raw material and equipment smuggled into the Gaza Strip using tunnels in Rafah, the al-Bana was the first example, during the Al-Aqsa Intifada, of Hamas' engineers capacity to produce relatively sophisticated weapons. It was to launch Palestinian rocket attacks on Israel.

The shoulder-fired al-Bana was extensively used during Israeli Defense Forces incursions to fight against tanks and armored vehicles. The al-Bana was replaced, in 2003, by the more elaborated Batar and is no longer used by Hamas. Slightly modified versions of the al-Bana were made and used by other Palestinian militant groups. In 2004, Hamas engineers provided the group with a new and sophisticated shoulder-fired rocket launcher, the Yasin.

See also 
Palestinian domestic weapons production

References 

Anti-tank rockets of Palestine
Hamas
Palestinian inventions
Homemade firearms
Insurgency weapons